Mercedes Capsir (20 July 1895 – 13 March 1969) was a Catalan opera singer, a high coloratura soprano, particularly associated with light Italian roles, such as Lucia and Gilda.

Life and career 
Mercedes Capsir was born in Barcelona, in the same house where another Spanish soprano, Maria Barrientos, had been born 12 years earlier. She studied (piano, composition, voice) at the Conservatori Superior de Música del Liceu, before making her debut in Genora, in 1913, as Gilda in Rigoletto, a role she will remain closely associated with throughout her career.

In 1916, she made her debut at the Liceu in Barcelona, the Teatro Real in Madrid, the Teatro Nacional de São Carlos in Lisbon, the Teatro Colón in Buenos Aires, as well as at the Paris Opera in 1917. Gilda was her debut role at all these opera houses.

Her Italian debut took place in Bologna, as Rosina in Il barbiere di Siviglia, followed by Elvira in I puritani, in Venice, opposite Giacomo Lauri-Volpi, she also appeared in Rome, before
reaching La Scala in Milan, in 1924, again as Gilda, opposite
baritone Carlo Galeffi and tenor Miguel Fleta, and conducted by 
Arturo Toscanini.

Capsir sang mainly in Europe, and in a very limited repertory, other roles included: Amina in La sonnambula, Lucia in
Lucia di Lammermoor, and Violetta in La traviata. She took part in performances of Giordano's Il Re at La Scala in 1929.

Capsir retired from the stage in 1949, her final performance took place at the Liceu in Barcelona, as Carolina in Il matrimonio segreto, and then turned to teaching. She died, aged 73, in Suzzara (Lombardy, Italy).

Mercedes Capsir recorded in 1928, complete versions of Il barbiere di Siviglia and Rigoletto, opposite Riccardo Stracciari and Dino Borgioli. She also recorded the first ever complete Lucia di Lammermoor and La traviata.  In Spain and also for the Columbia Record Co. she recorded the Spanish zarzuela "Marina" by Arrieta in a performance which also featured Hipolito Lazaro and Jose Mardones.

Sources 
 Alain Pâris, Dictionnaire des interprètes et de l'interpretation musicale au XX siècle (2 vols), Éditions Robert Laffont (Bouquins, Paris 1982, 4th ed. 1995, 5th Edn 2004). 
 Roland Mancini and Jean-Jacques Rouveroux,  (orig. H. Rosenthal and J. Warrack, French edition), Guide de l’opéra, Les indispensables de la musique (Fayard, 1995). 

1895 births
1969 deaths
Opera singers from Catalonia
Spanish operatic sopranos
Fonotipia Records artists
20th-century Spanish women opera singers
Singers from Barcelona